Mohammed Rafeh (9 March 1982 – 2 November 2012) was a Palestinian Syrian actor popular around the Arab world. He was notable for his role as Ibrahim in the popular Syrian television series Bab Al-Hara.

Rafeh was born in Aleppo, a half Syrian and half Palestinian. His father was a Palestinian refugee and as well an actor, Ahmad Rafeh. Mohammed Rafeh was notable for his support of the Syrian government. During the Syrian Civil War, Rafeh's picture appeared on a Facebook page titled "The black list of Syrian artists". Rafeh's father said that Mohammed loved Syria and the president Bashar al-Assad.

Death
Rafeh was kidnapped by the Free Syrian Army's al-Siddiq battalion on 2 November 2012 in Damascus' Barzeh neighborhood. On the same day, he was executed by gunshots to his head, neck and shoulders. On 4 November, his body was returned to his family and buried the next day.

References

1982 births
2012 deaths
People from Aleppo
Syrian male television actors
Syrian people of Palestinian descent
People of the Syrian civil war
Deaths by firearm in Syria
Terrorism deaths in Syria